Samar Gewog (Dzongkha: ས་དམར་) is a gewog (village block) of Haa District, Bhutan. In 2002, the gewog had an area of 361.7 square kilometres and contains 244 households.

References

Gewogs of Bhutan
Haa District